This is a list of all captains of the University Football Club, an Australian rules football club that formerly participated in the Victorian Football League.

References

History of University

Lists of Australian Football League captains
Captains
Melbourne sport-related lists